Argyresthia inscriptella is a moth of the  family Yponomeutidae. It is found in North America, including Arizona.

The wingspan is about 8 mm. The forewings are silvery white, with dark golden or bronze-brown markings. The hindwings are rather dark fuscous.

References

Moths described in 1907
Argyresthia
Moths of North America